Somewhere Out There is the 7th full album released by MONKEY MAJIK on March 7, 2012. The album itself is a dedication to Sendai and all of those affected by the 2011 Tōhoku earthquake and tsunami, with songs that are reflective of this theme. The lead single from the album is "Headlight", followed by "HERO". "Ki wo Ueta Otoko" was released in 2011 as a digital charity single for the earthquakes.

Track listing
All songs written by Maynard Plant, Blaise Plant and tax, except 3 & 5 by Maynard and Blaise, and 8, written (and originally performed) by 小田和正 (Kazumasa Oda).

Special Edition Bonus DVD
MONKEY MAJIK BEST ALBUM TOUR2010 ～10years&Forever～at 東京C.C.Lemonホール LIVE映像 (Tokyo C.C. Lemon Hall Live Eizou/Video) (53:42)
 goin' places
 tired
 
 
 Lily
 Angel
 
 Open Happiness
 One moment
 I like pop
 
 FOREVER

External links
 Official Web Site of Monkey Majik

References

Monkey Majik albums
2012 albums
Avex Group albums